Wuppertal I is an electoral constituency (German: Wahlkreis) represented in the Bundestag. It elects one member via first-past-the-post voting. Under the current constituency numbering system, it is designated as constituency 102. It is located in western North Rhine-Westphalia, comprising most of the city of Wuppertal.

Wuppertal I was created for the inaugural 1949 federal election. Since 2017, it has been represented by Helge Lindh of the Social Democratic Party (SPD).

Geography
Wuppertal I is located in western North Rhine-Westphalia. As of the 2021 federal election, it comprises the entirety of the independent city of Wuppertal excluding the districts of Cronenberg and Ronsdorf.

History
Wuppertal I was created in 1949. In the 1949 election, it was North Rhine-Westphalia constituency 16 in the numbering system. From 1953 through 1961, it was number 75. From 1965 through 1998, it was number 69. From 2002 through 2009, it was number 103. Since 2013, it has been number 102.

Originally, the constituency comprised the districts of Elberfeld, Elberfeld-West, Uellendahl-Katernberg, Vohwinkel, and Cronenberg from the city of Wuppertal. It acquired its current borders in the 2002 election.

Members
The constituency was first represented by Carl Wirths of the Free Democratic Party (FDP) from 1949 to 1957. He was succeeded by Otto Schmidt of the Christian Democratic Union (CDU) in the 1957 election. Schmidt served until 1965, when Hermann Herberts of the Social Democratic Party (SPD) was elected for a single term. Adolf Scheu of the SPD succeeded him in 1969 and served until 1980. He was followed by Rudolf Dreßler until 2002. Manfred Zöllmer was representative from 2002 to 2017. Helge Lindh was elected in 2017.

Election results

2021 election

2017 election

2013 election

2009 election

References

Federal electoral districts in North Rhine-Westphalia
Wuppertal
1949 establishments in West Germany
Constituencies established in 1949